Nikitich may refer to:

Surname
Dobrynya Nikitich, bogatyr medieval Knight of Kiev Rus

Patronymic
David Nikitich Kugultinov (1922–2006), writer of Kalmyk, acclaimed as a Soviet poet
Ivan Nikitich Khovansky (died 1675), Russian boyar and voyevoda, nephew of Ivan Andreyevich Khovansky and cousin of Taratui
Ivan Nikitich Smirnov (1881–1936), Communist Party activist
Ivan Nikitich Nikitin (1690–1741), Russian painter, an author of portraits and battle paintings
Nikolay Nikitich Popovsky (1730–1760), Russian poet and protégé of Mikhail Lomonosov
Viktor Nikitich Panin (1801–1862), conservative Russian Minister of Justice (1841–1862)

See also
Dobrynya Nikitich and Zmey Gorynych, Russian traditionally animated feature film directed by Ilya Maksimov